Palaquium lisophyllum is a tree in the family Sapotaceae. The specific epithet lisophyllum means "smooth leaves".

Description
The twigs are brownish. Inflorescences bear up to four flowers.

Distribution and habitat
Palaquium lisophyllum is endemic to Borneo. Its habitat is mixed dipterocarp forests.

References

lisophyllum
Endemic flora of Borneo
Trees of Borneo
Plants described in 1909